Skinny & Proud is the second album by rap group, The Skinny Boys. It was released on October 17, 1987 for Jive Records, distributed by RCA Records and was produced by Mark Bush and Chuck Chillout.

Track listing
"Skinny And Proud"
"I Wanna Be Like"
"Rip The Cut, Part 2"
"Cries Of The City"
"Cool Johnny"
"Something From The Past"
"This Record Is Hell"
"I Won't Stop"
"Poison This Place"

1987 albums
The Skinny Boys albums